The official flag of Wallis and Futuna is the French national flag, as it is a French territory. Wallis and Futuna has a locally used unofficial flag which bears the French flag in the canton.

Description
The unofficial flag of Wallis and Futuna features a red saltire on a white square, which in turn is placed on a red field (alternatively, a larger white cross pattée is used). The cross is shifted a little off centre toward the fly (outer edge). The cross pattée is also shifted slightly downwards. The flag of France outlined in white on two sides is in the upper hoist quadrant. This flag is used to represent Wallis and Fatuna at events such as the Pacific Games. For official occasions, the French flag is used.

Subdivision flags
The three constituent kingdoms of Wallis and Futuna have separate royal standards:

Historical flags

See also 
 Flag of France
 Coat of arms of Wallis and Futuna

References

External links 
 

Flag
Flags of Overseas France
Wallis